The 2016–17 Hampton Pirates men's basketball team represented Hampton University during the 2016–17 NCAA Division I men's basketball season. The Pirates, led by eighth-year head coach Edward Joyner, played their home games at the Hampton Convocation Center as members of the Mid-Eastern Athletic Conference. They finished the season 14–17, 11–5 in MEAC play to finish in a tie for third place. They lost in the quarterfinals of the MEAC tournament to Maryland Eastern Shore. They were invited to the College Basketball Invitational where they lost in the first round to Coastal Carolina.

Previous season
The Pirates finished the 2015–16 season 21–11, 13–3 in MEAC play to win the MEAC regular season championship. They defeated Morgan State, Savannah State, and South Carolina State to win the MEAC tournament and earn the conference's automatic bid to the NCAA tournament. As a No. 16 seed in the NCAA Tournament, they lost in the First round to Virginia.

Preseason 
The Pirates were picked to finish in third place in the preseason MEAC poll.

Roster

Schedule and results

|-
!colspan=9 style=| Non-conference regular season

|-
!colspan=9 style=| MEAC regular season

|-
!colspan=9 style=| MEAC tournament

|-
!colspan=9 style=| CBI

References

Hampton Pirates men's basketball seasons
Hampton
Hampton
Hampton Pirates
Hampton Pirates